The Alabama Department of Corrections (ADOC) is the agency responsible for incarceration of convicted felons in the state of Alabama in the United States. It is headquartered in the Alabama Criminal Justice Center in Montgomery.

Alabama has relatively long mandatory sentencing laws compared to most other states, resulting in a rising prison population stemming from longer prison sentences. It operates the nation's most crowded prison system. In 2015 it housed more than 24,000 inmates in a system designed for 13,318. In 2015 it settled a class-action suit over physical and sexual violence against inmates at the Julia Tutwiler Prison for Women in Wetumpka. The department also spends the least of any state on a per-prisoner basis.

As of 2018, Alabama has the 6th highest incarceration rate under state prison or local jail jurisdiction per 100,000 population in the U.S.

History
Alabama prisoners in both the county jails and state penitentiaries have been required to work at farming and cotton plantations since the 1840s. By the 1878, convict labor rented from the state was used most commonly in the coal mining industry, often as strike breakers. In 1894 one coal company employed 1,138 convicts, another used 589. In late 1883, a state inspector discovered a prisoner working in a mine eight years after the end of his sentence.

At the Banner Mine disaster in 1911, most of the 128 killed were Black convicts. The state ceased renting prisoners to mines in about 1900, although county sheriffs continued the practice until 1927.

In the 1970s, Alabama prisons were ordered to undertake major reforms by a Federal judge who described some conditions as "barbaric." Among other things, the judge ordered the closing of "dog houses," the name for hot, dark and filthy cells jammed with inmates being punished.

In 2007 the prison system ended its farming programs, rendering many prisoners idle.

In 2016, Governor Robert Bentley proposed $800 million dollars in state bonds to build four large prisons, each with a designed capacity of 3,500 prisoners. This program would allow the state to close an unspecified number of older facilities. Press reports indicate the troubled Julia Tutwiler Prison for Women would be the first to be replaced; a federal class-action suit was settled in 2015 over abuse of women at that facility.

In October 2016, the US Department of Justice announced that it was conducting a review and investigation of Alabama's men's prisons to evaluate conditions as the Constitution promises humane treatment. "The investigation will focus on whether prisoners are adequately protected from physical harm and sexual abuse at the hands of other prisoners; whether prisoners are adequately protected from use of excessive force and staff sexual abuse by correctional officers; and whether the prisons provide sanitary, secure and safe living conditions."

In his February 2017 State of the State address, Governor Bentley talked in more detail about his proposed three-faceted approach to overhaul the Department of Corrections: "One, close Julia Tutwiler Prison for Women and build a new 1,200 bed women’s facility; Two, consolidate 13 of 15 close- and medium-security men’s facilities into three, new, 4,000-bed, state-of-the-art prisons and; Three, repurpose and renovate the remaining antiquated, facilities into Rehabilitation and Re-entry Centers focused on preparing inmates for release back into the community."

In June, 2017 a federal court pointed out the Department provided inadequate mental health case, suicide prevention, psychotherapy, programming, out-of-cell time as well as monitoring of suicidal inmates.

In 2019 the U.S. Department of Justice found conditions in Alabama prisons to be unsafe and unconstitutional, as result of a long civil rights investigation prompted by numerous deaths from violence in Alabama lockups. Prisoners routinely face prisoner-on-prisoner violence and sexual abuse, unprotected by the State. The DOJ notes "a high level of violence that is too common, cruel, of an unusual nature, and pervasive."

The detailed report outlines cases of inmate deaths, rapes, extortion of prisoners' families and rampant contraband weapons and drugs. It says facilities violate the constitution, by not providing "adequate humane conditions of confinement."

By the end of 2019, the legislature had not yet funded Governor Bentley's plan for new facilities. The state announced that most of the Holman prison would be closed.

Operations
All female inmates are sent to the receiving unit in the Julia Tutwiler Prison for Women.

Facilities
 List of Alabama state prisons

Death row

Unlike other states, Alabama has no provision to provide counsel to prisoners on Death Row. Prisoners' rights groups such as the Equal Justice Initiative based in Montgomery, Alabama, have worked to fill the need. They have gained the exoneration of numerous innocent men on death row and prevented the deaths of others whose cases were considered worthy of resentencing.

The US Supreme Court has ruled that persons convicted of crimes committed as children cannot be sentenced to death. In addition, it has ruled that persons convicted of crimes committed as children cannot be sentenced to life in prison without parole (LWOP), saying that both kinds of sentences are unconstitutional. It has directed that its ruling on LWOP is to be applied retroactively and states must undertake reviews of prisoners who were sentenced to LWOP for crimes committed as children.

Holman Correctional Facility is the site where all executions authorized by the state are conducted. Its male death row originally had a capacity of 20. In the summer of 2000, capacity was increased to 200 single cells.

The William E. Donaldson Correctional Facility has a male death row with a capacity of 24. Donaldson's death row houses prisoners who need to stay in the Birmingham judicial district. Julia Tutwiler Prison for Women holds the female death row.

In February 2018, the Alabama Department of Corrections was responsible for carrying out the botched attempted execution of Doyle Hamm. During the execution attempt, executioners attempted for nearly three hours to insert an IV that could be used to administer the lethal injection drugs. In the process, the execution team punctured Hamm's bladder and femoral artery, causing significant bleeding.

Fallen officers
Since the establishment of the Alabama Department of Corrections, eleven officers and three K-9 have died while on duty.

Gallery

See also

 List of law enforcement agencies in Alabama
 List of United States state correction agencies
 List of United States state prisons
 Prison
List of U.S. states and territories by incarceration and correctional supervision rate

References

External links
 Alabama DOC Website

State law enforcement agencies of Alabama
State corrections departments of the United States
1983 establishments in Alabama
Penal system in Alabama
Prisons in Alabama